Muslimabad Kohat is a village of Kohat District of Khyber Pakhtunkhwa, Pakistan.

Populated places in Kohat District